This is a list of notable people from Dieppe, New Brunswick. Although not everyone in this list was born in Dieppe, they all live or have lived in Dieppe and have had significant connections to the community.

See also
 List of people from New Brunswick

References

Dieppe, New Brunswick
Dieppe